Lambeth was a constituency 1832—1885 loosely equivalent in area to the later administrative units: the London Borough of Lambeth and the south-west and centre of the London Borough of Southwark.  It returned two members of parliament (MPs) to the House of Commons of the UK Parliament by the bloc vote version of the first-past-the-post system.

History

The constituency was among many created under the Great Reform Act (for the 1832 general election) and abolished by the Redistribution of Seats Act 1885 for the 1885 general election when it was divided into eight single-member seats: Camberwell North, Camberwell Peckham, Lambeth Brixton, Lambeth Kennington, Lambeth North, Lambeth Norwood, Newington Walworth and Newington West.

Boundaries
Under original proposals it would have been greater, taking all of Dulwich and Brixton and possibly two parishes to the east. The commissioners appointed to fix parliamentary boundaries attempted to equalise the seven new "metropolitan" constituencies of London in number of voters and in population. For this reason Bermondsey and Rotherhithe were assigned to Southwark. It was also decided not to include the entirety of the parishes of Camberwell and Lambeth: both were very large parishes running five or six miles south from the Thames. The portions closest to the river were heavily built up, but the southern sections were mainly rural. Dulwich and part of Brixton were therefore excluded, instead forming part of East Surrey.

The boundaries were detailed in the schedules of the Parliamentary Boundaries Act 1832, and consisted of:
The entire parish of St Mary Newington
The parish of St Giles Camberwell (except for the Manor and Hamlet of Dulwich) 
The part of the parish of Lambeth north of a line defined in the act.

The area was unchanged when parliamentary seats were next redistributed under the Reform Act 1867.

Members of Parliament

Election results

Elections in the 1830s

Elections in the 1840s

Elections in the 1850s
Pearson resigned, causing a by-election.

Elections in the 1860s
Roupell resigned, causing a by-election.

Williams' death caused a by-election.

Election in the 1870s

Election in the 1880s

Notes

Bibliography

Parliamentary constituencies in London (historic)
Constituencies of the Parliament of the United Kingdom established in 1832
Constituencies of the Parliament of the United Kingdom disestablished in 1885
Politics of the London Borough of Lambeth
History of the London Borough of Lambeth
1832 establishments in England